The JL-3 is a Chinese third-generation intercontinental-range submarine-launched ballistic missile (SLBM) in development. It will likely deploy on the Type 096, a predicted future class of Chinese ballistic missile submarine.

The JL-3 is expected to carry multiple independently targetable reentry vehicles—warheads capable of targeting numerous separate locations. The first test flight occurred on 24 November 2018 in the Bohai Sea; it was likely a test of the launch tube's cold-launch ejection system. Testing continued through June 2019.

An analyst cited by The South China Morning Post stated that it would take until approximately 2025 for China to fully integrate the JL-3 into the Type 096 submarine.

The development of the missile has reportedly been separated from work on the Type 096 submarine in order to accelerate its development.

In November 2022, the United States Navy reported that the Type 094 submarine was rearmed with the JL-3.

References 

Submarine-launched ballistic missiles of the People's Republic of China
Nuclear weapons of the People's Republic of China